Game (capitalized as GAME) is the debut studio album by Japanese girl group Perfume. It was released on April 16, 2008 by Tokuma Japan Communications. Game marks Perfume's first studio album to be fully produced by Japanese producer and Capsule member Yasutaka Nakata, while Perfume contributes to the album as the lead and background vocalists.

Game was recorded and mixed by Nakata in Shibuya, Tokyo. Four different formats were released to promote the album; a standalone CD, a limited CD and DVD bundle, and a digital release. It was re-released in February 2016 as a 12-inch LP, featured in both Perfume's 2016 box set Perfume Complete LP Box and a limited singular release. Two different artworks were issued for the album's cover sleeve; one has Perfume inside a small room with synthetic grass, while the second has Perfume holding LED lamps in a dark room.

Upon the album's release, it was met with mixed to favorable reviews from music critics. Several critics highlighted the commercial appeal, composition, and noted it as a resurgence of the techno-pop genre. However, some critics were ambivalent towards the album's lack of personality and polished production. Game has been listed on several publication lists as their best albums of 2008 and the J-pop genre. Commercially, Game was a success. It became Perfume's debut studio album to reach the top spot on Japan's Oricon Albums Chart and was certified double platinum by the Recording Industry Association of Japan (RIAJ) for shipments of 500,000 units.

Three singles were released from Game, including one promotional, one a-side single, and extended play. Its lead single and EP Fan Service (Sweet) reached number 31 on Japan's Oricon Singles Chart, while its spawning promotional single "Chocolate Disco" reached number 24 on Japan's Hot 100 chart. The second single "Polyrhythm" reached number seven on the Oricon Singles Chart, and was one of the theme songs for the Pixar film Cars 2. The album's third and final single, the a-side release "Baby Cruising Love/Macaroni" reached number three on the Oricon Singles Chart. Perfume promoted the album on their 2009 Game Tour.

Background and development
After signing to Tokuma Japan Communications in September 2005, Perfume and Tokuma enlisted long-term collaborator, Japanese producer and Capsule member Yasutaka Nakata, to produce their work; this marks Perfume's first collaboration with Nakata. The collaboration spawned a series of singles including "Linear Motor Girl", "Computer City", and "Electro World". These singles were included on Perfume's compilation album Perfume: Complete Best in 2006. In December 2006, Perfume and Nakata released the Game album track "Twinkle Snow Powder Snow" as a digital download single, the group's first. The following month, Game album track "Chocolate Disco" was released in January 2007 and confirmed to be included on the then-upcoming album's lead A-side single. Then, in late January and early February 2008, Perfume confirmed the release of a new studio album in April that same year.

Perfume and Tokuma hired Nakata to produce the album; this marks Perfume's debut studio album to be fully produced by Nakata. Perfume began recording the remaining tracks in Shibuya, Tokyo at Contemode Studios between 2007–2008 with Nakata. Nakata mastered and recorded the album with Perfume, and finished overall at the end of March 2008. The material from Game took nearly two-and-a-half years to produce and record, making it Perfume's longest spanning project to date. The material marks Perfume's first out of five studio albums to be fully composed, written, and arranged by Nakata. Perfume member A-Chan viewed Game as a concept album, stating "We see each album as being like a concept album...". Perfume member Nocchi expressed her delight of the finishing, stating "This is our first original album. It turned out so good that in every interview I have to say we are confident. It is cool! So I really want people to listen to it."

Composition and language

Game is an electronic dance album that borrows numerous musical elements including technopop and J-pop. Ian Martin from AllMusic stated, "Perfume are not like other Japanese manufactured idol groups is evident from the trio's popularity among not only traditional pop fans but also large numbers of indie and electronic music fans." A staff member from CD Journal identified that the album's strongest musical genre was technopop; several other reviewers and editors, such as a staff reviewer from Amazon.com and Zac Bentz from Japanator.com, also had similar hypothesises. Retrospectively, a staff member from MTV Iggy felt that the Japanese club and electronic culture had influenced all of Perfume's studio albums, including Game. In an interview with Nakata, he stated that he was particularly interested in re-inventing the term technopop for the Japanese music scene; a term that was recognized in the 1980s in Western culture. Technopop was first introduced to Japanese culture in the 1980s by Japanese band Yellow Magic Orchestra, who employed the genre in their studio album Naughty Boys (1983). Alongside this, Nakata incorporated his post-Shibuya-kei sound which he had initially used for the songs produced with Perfume during their time as an indies idol group, into the tracks from Game.

Perfume admitted that they didn't know of the techno genre prior to Game; A-Chan stated in an interview with Bomb magazine "Well, we have just gotten to the point where we got to like techno music. But we are on the level that we ‘like’ it, and we don’t know the depth of it beyond that. I don’t think it is good to go to the next step without learning anything. So I want to know techno to the full first. It may be hard but I want to try at least." Nocchi felt that techno music, at the time of the release of Game, represented Perfume. Game is Perfume's first album to feature an English language song; the track "Take me Take me".

Songs

The album's opening track, "Polyrhythm", is influenced by technopop and dance-pop music that was noted for its "summery" vibe. "Plastic Smile" is a "retro" technopop song that was noted by critics for its "cheap" and "simple" production. The album's title utilizes rock instrumentation over a heavy bass and trance-inspired synthesizer; Ian Martin and Asian Junkie editor Random J noted by critics for its similar comparisons from the work of French duo and producers Daft Punk. "Baby Cruising Love" is a technopop song that fuses musical elements of dance-pop and pop ballad; Martin labeled the song "comparatively inoffensive and characterless J-pop...". "Chocolate Disco" is an upbeat dance song that was noted by critics for its "cute" appeal. According to a staff member from Channel-Ai, they noted live instrumentation of drum machines in the sixth album track "Macaroni". The song was noted by critics as a mid-tempo techno-pop song with elements of lounge and house music. The album's seventh track, "Ceramic Girl", was noted by critics as a "high energetic" electropop song with musical elements of 1980s disco music.

"Take Me, Take Me" is a house track with elements of downtempo music. Nia from Selective Hearing commented, though it was a "sensual" track by Perfume, it "divided opinions amongst fans; some think that it’s a great song and others think that it’s too repetitive to be interesting." "Secret Secret" starts with a "dreamy" intro and builds up with electronic dance synths. The song was highlighted by critics as the album's most "diverse" track, noting that it offered an "atmospheric composition" and "high powered dance song". "Butterfly" incorporates the ambient and non-diegetic sound of rainforest and animal calls. An electro house song, it incorporates live instrumentation of string arrangements and instrumental sections. "Twinkle Snow Powder Snow" was noted by critics as the album's "least favoured song"; while Channel Ai labeled it a "cheerful danceable and catchy techno tune", Nia commented "'Twinkle Snow Powdery Snow' is a bit of a mood whiplash with its perky melody and wintery instrumental. It’s not a bad song but probably my least favorite on the album." The album's closing track, "Puppy Love", was noted by critics for its "light and delicate" production, and was labeled by Nia as a very "sweet" track.

Release and packaging
Game was released in three different formats on April 16, 2008 by Tokuma Japan Communications. The standalone CD format features the fourteen tracks in a jewel case, with first press editions including an obi and a bonus poster. The CD and DVD format feature the fourteen tracks and a bonus DVD with the music videos to "Macaroni" and "Secret Secret". The DVD also included two live performances in Japan and three individual music videos to "Macaroni" recorded by the Perfume members separately. It was published in a jewel case with some editions with a cardboard sleeve; First press editions included an obi. The final format was a digital release that was released in Japan only that same release date.

Two cover sleeves for Game were photographed by Japanese photographer and designer Mari Amita. The standalone CD artwork has Perfume inside a four-by-four room, floored with synthetic grass and powered by strong ceiling lighting. The album's title is superimposed on the ceiling. The standalone CD booklet features shots of Perfume inside that room, with no other picture otherwise. The CD and DVD artwork feature Perfume in a dark room, holding several LED lamps with the album's title superimposed them. The CD and DVD booklet features different shots of Perfume in the four-by-four room and shots of Perfume in the dark room. The digital release uses the standalone CD artwork. The booklet and photo shoot was designed by Mayuko Yuki.

In February 2012, the group had signed a record contract with Universal Music Japan after leaving Tokuma Japan Communications to record their third album JPN. They signed a global record contract with Universal Music Group to release JPN globally but received rights by Tokuma Communications to release their discography globally, and Game was subsequently released worldwide in March 2012 digitally. In November 2015, Perfume and Universal (with publishing rights from Tokuma and Crown Tokuma) announced the re-release of all their studio albums, including Game, on 12-inch vinyl LPs in a collective vinyl box set. The vime waLP s released in two editions; part of the box set entitled Perfume Complete LP Box, and a limited edition singular release on February 17, 2016. The artwork for the viLPses the CD and DVD cover, with a slip-in case of the standalone CD artwork.

Promotion

Singles
Fan Service (Sweet) was released as the album's lead single and first and final extended play single on February 14, 2007. The EP consists of two single tracks; "Twinkle Snow Powder Snow" and "Chocolate Disco", alongside a bonus DVD with a music video for each single. Upon its release, Fan Service (Sweet) received mixed reviews from music critics. Many music critics commended the production of "Chocolate Disco", and favored it more over "Twinkle Snow Powdery Snow". Fan Service (Sweet) was moderately successful in Japan, peaking at number 31 on the Japanese Oricon Singles Chart, and sold over 10,000 units in that region. After its release, "Twinkle Snow Powder Snow" and "Chocolate Disco" was released promotionally through airplay in Japan. "Chocolate Disco" charted at number 24 on the Japan Hot 100 chart and 76 on the RIAJ Digital Track Chart in Japan. Both singles received a music video; "Twinkle Snow Powder Snow" features Perfume dancing to the song in a futuristic city whilst walking through a snow-storm. The music video to "Chocolate Disco" featured Perfume singing and dancing to the song in front of several laser lights and in several divided mirrors.

"Polyrhythm" was released as the album's second overall and first singular single on September 12, 2007. It was released as a standalone CD with the bonus track "Seventh Heaven", and a CD and DVD bundle featuring the music video to the single. Upon its release, "Polyrhythm" received positive reviews from music critics. Many critics commended the composition of the track, Nakata's production, and the group's "vocoder" vocals. "Polyrhythm" was a commercial success, reaching number seven on Japan's Oricon Singles Chart and stayed in the top 300 for 58 weeks, the group's longest spanning charting single to date. "Polyrhythm" has sold over 77,000 units in Japan and was certified gold by the Recording Industry Association of Japan (RIAJ) for digital and physical shipments of 100,000 units in that region, tallying up to 200,000 shifted units. A music video was shot for "Polyrhythm"; it features Perfume singing the song in a white room, with additional computer-generated imagery of various objects and living figures.

"Baby Cruising Love" and "Macaroni" were released as the album's third and final overall and first a-side single on January 16, 2008. It was released as a standalone CD, and a CD and DVD bundle featuring the music video to "Baby Cruising Love". Upon its release, "Baby Cruising Love" and "Macaroni" received positive reviews from music critics. Many critics commended both the tracks dance melodies and the group's vocals. Charting together, "Baby Cruising Love/Macaroni" was a commercial success, reaching number three on Japan's Oricon Singles Chart and stayed in the top 300 for 18 weeks. "Baby Cruising Love/Macaroni" has sold over 65,000 units in Japan to date. A music video was shot for "Baby Cruising Love"; it features Perfume dancing to the song in front of LED lamps, and holding a light orb.

Other charted singles
Album tracks; "Ceramic Girl" and "Secret Secret" both charted on the Japan Hot 100 chart, peaking at number 49 and 54 respectively. Neither of these tracks served as a promotional single or received any physical release. "Secret Secret" received a music video that was broadcast on Japanese television; it features Perfume dancing to the song on a studio set. Each chorus features Perfume wearing outfits from their singles that were included on Perfume: Complete Best and was based on Perfume's growth in popularity and concept in Japanese advertisement.

Advertisement and commercials
Before release, the album, on July 1, 2007, the commercial for NHK's national recycling campaign aired, featuring Perfume and their single, "Polyrhythm". The commercial was the group's first commercial release inside Japan. Subsequently, their next live show sold out, and Perfume became the first idol group to perform at the Summer Sonic music festival. The group managed to receive commercial endorsements with the usage of their songs from the album. "Butterfly" was used as a commercial theme for Infinite Frontier for Nintendo DS and "Secret Secret" was used in an Eskimo Pino commercial. All three singles including "Ceramic Girl" received a commercial endorsement feature, including deals with NTV and theme songs (both ending and opening).

"Polyrhythm" was featured on the soundtrack of 2011 American animated film Cars 2, which marked the group's first entry into the western market. In response, Perfume was invited to attend the movie premiere in Los Angeles, California. The director, John Lasseter, was happy to see the girls there and said: "The moment I listened to Polyrhythm, I loved it, it was like falling in love."

Concert tour
To promote Game, Perfume went on two promotional tours; the Seventh Heaven tour at the Liquidroom in Japan, and the Perfume Socks Fix Makes Tour in Shibyua, Tokyo. For the Seventh Heaven tour, the album tracks: "Polyrhythm", "Chocolate Disco", and the b-side track "Seventh Heaven" were included on the set list. The tour received positive reviews from music critics; Tetsuo Hiraga commended the tour, praising certain tracks and the overall stage production. For the Socks Fix Makes, the album tracks: "Baby Cruising Love", "Twinkle Snow Powder Snow", "Macaroni", "Chocolate Disco", "Polyrhythm", and the b-side track "Seventh Heaven" were included on the set list. The tour received positive reviews from music critics; Hiraga felt the Shibuya concert was an improvement from the Seventh Heaven tour and commended the sufficiency in the material.

After the album's release, the group had officially announced that their 2008 Game Tour would commence in late April 2008. The group toured 10 cities in Japan and sold out all tickets to each concert. For the Game tour, the album tracks: the title track, "Twinkle Snow Powdery Snow", "Take Me Take Me", "Secret Secret", "Macaroni", "Chocolate Disco", and "Ceramic Girl" were included on the set list. The tour received positive reviews from music critics; Hiraga felt the Yokohama concert was "impressive" in sound diversity and production, and commended Perfume's vocal abilities and stage presence. On the final date of the tour, Perfume announced that they would be doing a 2-day show at the prestigious Nippon Budokan in November 2008 as well as the release date of their next single, "Love the World".

The concert tour was released on October 15, 2008 as a DVD. All performed album tracks were included on the DVD. The DVD reached number one on Japan's Oricon DVD Chart, Perfume's first number one DVD; it spent over 30 weeks in the top 300 chart. The DVD was certified gold by RIAJ for physical shipments of 100,000 units in Japan.

Critical reception

Game received mixed to favorable reviews from most music critics. A staff reviewer from Channel-Ai awarded the album four-and-a-half stars out of five, labeling the album as "interesting." The reviewer felt that while the album was more a "Yasutaka Nakata album featuring Perfume’s vocals," he concluded, "Nakata’s detailed production of Perfume’s sweet, charismatic vocals creates an irresistible listening experience." Nia from Selective Hearing praised the album for featuring tracks that she had liked altogether. Nia commented, "Personally, I think that’s a perfect balance to have when making an album and one of the strongest aspects of Game is that each track has its own unique sound and style...". She praised Nakata for creating a "perfect balanced" album that, he has since never done.

Asian Junkie editor Random J reviewed the album on his blog and awarded the album six-and-a-half stars out of ten. Random J stated "If you don't mind disconnected electro pop and techno, then you'll like this album. But if you like something with more to it, then you'll find these songs lack too much person-ability for your tastes." Random J concluded, however, "But for what it is, and those who are into this kind of music - it's a solid album. Perfume fans will not be disappointed. My love of electro pop and all things Daft Punk-esque is what has me really liking this album more than I thought I would. Definitely my guilty pleasure." Tetsuo Hiraga from Hot Express was positive in his review, commending Nakata's production and composition. Despite commending Perfume's image and vocal abilities, Hiraga went on to praise the songwriting for projecting "alive", "warm hearted" and "witty" themes to the album's tracks.

Ian Martin from AllMusic awarded the album 3.5 stars out of five. Martin felt the production was "overwhelming" by commenting "There are also a number of occasions where the production completely overwhelms the sometimes flimsy melodies on offer, and it's hard to escape the impression that producer Yasutaka Nakata's attitude to the three members' vocal contributions is basically one of damage limitation." He did, however, commend the album's catchiness and complimented the mixture of dance genres. Zac Bentz from Japanator.com gave the album a mixed review. He criticized the album's lack of development and personality and felt the album didn't have a diversity of musical genres outside of electronic dance music. He commented, "If Perfume doesn't start expanding their sound, maybe moving out of the cyber-dance cage Yasutaka has built up around them into, say, more real-world territory, their remaining time may be limited."

Accolades and recognition
Game won the Best Female Band/Band with female lead vocal Album of the Year award at the DBSK in French J-Pop Awards 2008. At the 1st Annual CD Shop Awards, Game was first-equal runner-up with Ohashi Trio's This is Music for the Grand Prix award. The winner of the night was Sōtaisei Riron's Shifon Shugi (2008). The album won the Album of Excellence Award at the 50th Japan Record Awards; it shared its recognition with Beyond Standard by Hiromi Uehara, Keiichi Suzuki's Hate Captain and Love Officer, Namie Amuro's Best Fiction, and Fuyumi Sakamoto's Masterpiece Song Spelling.

In July 2010, Game was featured in Music Magazine'''s Best Top 100 Domestic Albums of 2000, ranking the album at number nine. As of February 2016, Ian Martin from AllMusic recognized Game as Perfume's best studio album and highlighted the album as the top pick from their discography. Martin highlighted the album tracks: "Baby Cruising Love", "Chocolate Disco", "Macaroni", "Polyrhythm", and "Twinkle Snow Powder Snow" as some of Perfume's best tracks from the album and their entire career. Julie from Go Boiano listed Game at number 12 on her 15 Awesome Albums for Beginners of J-pop; she stated "Pulling from techno trends even before Hatsune Miku made it cool, the girls have built up a considerable fanbase with their skilled dancing, catchy songs, and unique electronica vocals. Game showcases them at their best, and if you're a fan of Miku or techno doujin music, why not check out the original masters of electropop?".

Commercial performanceGame debuted at number one on the Japanese Daily Oricon Albums Chart, staying there for an entire week. This resulted in the album debuting atop the Japanese Weekly Oricon Albums Chart, with an estimated 154,000 sold units in its first week of sales. This became the highest selling album by a female group for first week sales of 2008. Game became Perfume's first studio album to debut atop the Oricon Albums Chart for both Daily and Weekly rankings. Game became Nakata's first produced number one album, whilst Perfume's future albums handled by Nakata; Triangle, JPN, and Level3 continued this streak. Perfume was Nakata's first and only project to have reached number one until Japanese singer Kyary Pamyu Pamyu reached the top spot with Nanda Collection (2013) and Pika Pika Fantajin (2014). It slipped to number three the following week, shifting 59,552 in Japan. It stayed at number three of three weeks, in the top 10 for five weeks, and the top 300 with sixty-nine weeks overall. To date, Game is Perfume's longest spanning album in the Oricon Albums Chart.Game entered the Billboard Top Albums Sales Chart at number two, Perfume's first album to reach the top ten. It fell to number three the following week and stayed there for three consecutive weeks. Game was certified double platinum in April 2009 by the Recording Industry Association of Japan (RIAJ) for shipments of 500,000 units. To date, this is Perfume's only album to shift over 500,000 physical units in Japan. At the end of 2008, Game sold over 391,439 units in Japan; this ranked the twenty-third best selling album in Japan, and Perfume was the best selling girl group of that year. As the end of 2009, Game was placed 144th and sold over 61,415 units in Japan, ranking them the second best selling girl group behind Speed and Perfume's own entry with Triangle; Game sold over 10,486 in 2010. As of February 2016, Game has sold over 477,000 units in Japan.

Legacy

Following its release, Game has been cited as one of the most successful technopop albums of all time. Martin from AllMusic commented about Perfume; "That [Perfume] are not like other Japanese manufactured idol groups is evident from the trio's popularity among not only traditional pop fans but also large numbers of indie and electronic music fans." He concluded that the album "revealed a further refined version of the template of cute idol pop coupled with the more sophisticated dance music influences that had made them so successful." Martin had listed the album as their best album to date, citing it as an AV album highlight.Game and its accompanying singles marked the beginning of their rise in becoming not only a large factor in Japanese music but launched them into the Western market. Daniel Robson from The Japan Times commented "The sound [Nakata] perfected for [Perfume] with 2008′s breakthrough album [“Game”] caused a resurgence in demand for off-kilter electro-pop, at that time a niche genre, with labels rushing to release similar artists such as Immi, Sweet Vacation and Urbangarde." He said Japanese pop acts including Perfume and Kyary Pamyu Pamyu had "suddenly exploded in popularity" because they were "interesting."

After the album peaked at number one on the Oricon chart, the album became the first technopop album to reach at number one since Yellow Magic Orchestra did so with their album Naughty Boys. According to Tokyograph, this makes Perfume only the second technopop group ever to achieve this position. The album is currently the group's highest selling album, as well as Nakata Yasutaka's highest-selling produced album or material in his career. After Game, Perfume released more studio albums: Triangle, JPN, Level 3 and Cosmic Explorer, all peaking consecutively at number one on Oricon and were all certified platinum respectively.

A book about the album and the trajectory of Perfume's career was published in the 33 1/3 Japan book, Perfume's Game (2018) by Japan-based journalist Patrick St. Michel. In 2020, Jonathan McNamara of The Japan Times listed it as one of the 10 Japanese albums worthy of inclusion in Rolling Stone's 2020 list of the 500 greatest albums of all time, writing that the infectious grooves found on 'Game' and the immeasurable impact it left on both J-pop and electronic music make it essential listening for every pop music fan".

 Track listing 

Formats
 Standard CD – Consists of twelve songs on one disc.
 First pressing standard CD – Consists of twelve songs on one disc. First pressing issues include a bonus obi strip.
 CD and DVD – Consists of twelve songs on one disc. Includes five music videos and two live performances on the second disc. 
 First pressing CD and DVD – Consists of twelve songs on one disc. Includes five music videos and two live performances on the second disc. First pressing issues include a bonus obi strip.
 LP – Consists of six tracks on one analog LP, and another six tracks on the second.
 Digital download – Consists of twelve songs on one disc.

Personnel
Credits adapted from the liner notes of Game''.

Ayano Ōmoto (Nocchi) – lead vocals, background vocals
Ayaka Nishiwaki (A-Chan) – lead vocals, background vocals
Yuka Kashino (Kashiyuka) – lead vocals, background vocals
Yasutaka Nakata – songwriting, producing, composing, arranging, engineer, mixing, recorded by
Iku Aoki – album director
Masahiro Nakawaki – album director
Satoshi Hasegawa – promotion planning
Hideo Tanaka – sales promotion
Momoko Takimoto – product co-ordination
Atsuko Okuzono – super desk planner
Hiromi Okawa – management
Shiro Yamamoto – management
Yusuke Iwai – management
Kayoko Takimoto – management
Takeshi Fukuoka – management
Nozomi Ishimoto – executive producer
Masahiro Shinoki – executive producer
Yokichi Osato – supervisors
Sumio Matsuzaki – supervisors
Tatsuro Hatanaka – supervisors
Shingenori Nishino – supervisors
Kazuaki "Triple-O" Seki – art direction
Mari Amita – photographer
Mayuko "Triple-O" Yuki – designer
Ken Uchizawa – clothes stylist
Hatsuhiro Nozawa – hair stylist
Masako Osuga – make-up artist
Kiyoe Mizusawa – design coordinator
Tokuma Japan Communications – Perfume's distribution and record label
Universal Music Japan – Perfume's 2012–present label; distribution co-rights
Contemode – Nakata's distribution label, co-rights
Yamaha Music Communications – Nakata's distribution label, co-rights

Charts

Year-end charts

Certifications

See also
 List of Oricon number-one albums of 2008

Notes

References

External links
Game – Perfume's official website.
Game Interview – Hot Express website.

2008 albums
Japanese-language albums
Perfume (Japanese band) albums
2008 video albums
Tokuma Shoten albums
Albums produced by Yasutaka Nakata
Electropop video albums